The Michoacan deer mouse (Osgoodomys banderanus) is a species of rodent in the family Cricetidae.  It is the only species in the genus Osgoodomys, and is endemic to Mexico.

References

Musser, G. G. and M. D. Carleton. 2005. Superfamily Muroidea. pp. 894–1531 in Mammal Species of the World a Taxonomic and Geographic Reference. D. E. Wilson and D. M. Reeder eds. Johns Hopkins University Press, Baltimore.

Neotominae
Mammals described in 1897
Taxa named by Joel Asaph Allen
Taxonomy articles created by Polbot
Jalisco dry forests
Endemic mammals of Mexico